The Opel Rekord is a large family car which was built in eight generations by the German car manufacturer Opel. Between 1953 and 1986, approximately ten million were sold.

In 1986, the Rekord nameplate was replaced by the Opel Omega.

Naming
The Rekord name evolved into the main name of the model; at first the name was used in close relationship with the Opel Olympia name, which pre-dated the Rekord but was also reinstated in a separate model in 1967.

The various generations are described here with the manufacturer's, or other commonly used designations such as "Rekord P I" or "Rekord B". The car was not badged with these additional appellations.

Olympia Rekord (1953–1957)

The Opel Olympia Rekord was introduced in March 1953 as successor to the Opel Olympia, a pre-World War II design dating back to 1935. The Opel Olympia Rekord was built until 1957 in four different versions. Around 580,000 units were produced. Styling of the 1953–54 sedans resembled scaled-down versions of the contemporary Chevrolet in the U.S. Both cars were of course, products of General Motors.

1953/54: 1488 cc, . Available as two-door saloon, cabriolet and estate (Caravan). Price in Germany: DM 6,410 to 6,710. 136,028 units made.
1955: 1488 cc, . Mild facelift, comprising larger rear window, new grill insert. New base model called simply Olympia; a delivery, based on the saloon, was also introduced. Price in Germany: DM 5,850 to 6,710. 131,586 units made.
1956: 1488 cc, . New grill insert, bumpers now without guards. Price in Germany: DM 5,410 to 6,560. 144,587 units made.
1957: 1488 cc, . New grill insert again, flatter roof, chrome strips along belt line. The cabriolet was no longer part of the line. Prices in Germany: DM 5,510 to 6,560. 169,721 units made.

General data:
Wheelbase 
Length 
Width 
Height 
Kerb weight -
Top speed approximately

Rekord P1 (July 1957 – July 1960)

The Opel (Olympia) Rekord P1 had a slightly larger, more modern body with wraparound windscreen and rear screen, introducing to Germany the latest American fashion of two-tone paintwork.

The standard model was sold as the Opel Olympia Rekord, while a reduced specification version was marketed simply as the Opel Olympia and widely known, less formally, as the "Bauern-Buick" (Peasant's Buick).

A new base version with an 1196 cc engine appeared in 1959 badged more simply as the Opel 1200, and replacing the Opel Olympia.

A semi-automatic gearbox ("Olymat") became available for model year 1959. Initially the car retained the 1488 cc,  of its predecessor: this was complemented by a 1680 cc, 55 PS;L engine for model year 1960.

The PI remained in production until 1960.

 1958–59: 1488 cc, . Available as two-door "Olympia" base model or more luxurious two-door "Olympia Rekord" and as three-door estate ("Caravan") and "delivery" van based on the saloon. Price in Germany: DM 5,785 to 6,845. 509,110 units were made.
 1959: 1488 cc, ; on request 1680 cc, . Also available as four-door saloon. Several refinements including padded dashboard, ignition lock, electrically driven windscreen wipers. The new base model "Opel 1200" replaced the former Olympia (1196 cc, DM 5,835); the 1200 remained in production until December 1962, while the P I was superseded in August 1960 by the Rekord P II.

Price in Germany: DM 6,545 to 7,110. 307,000 units (P I) + 67.952 units (1200). In 1959–60, Karosseriebau Autenrieth of Darmstadt, Germany converted P I two-door sedans to coupés and cabriolets, in very limited numbers. Prices were DM 9,380 for the coupé and DM 11,180 for the convertible.

General data:
Wheelbase 
Length 
Width 
Height 
Kerb weight -
Top speed –.

Rekord P2 (1960–1963)

The Opel Rekord P2 grew in size, if not in wheelbase, and received a totally new body that did away with wraparound windows. It was available in several body versions: 2-door and 4-door saloon, a 3-door estate ("Caravan") plus delivery van, a pick-up, and a convertible. From August 1961 on, a works coupé became available, and in June 1962 a more luxurious "L" version was added with a new top engine of 1700 cc "S" and a higher compression ratio. The latest versions had an optional four-speed gearbox.

Prices in Germany: DM 6,545 to 7,770. 787,684 units made. Autenrieth continued to sell a handful of convertibles at DM 11,635.

General data:
Engines: 1488 cc, or 1680 cc,  or 1680 cc, 
Wheelbase 
Length 
Width 
Height 
Kerb weight -
Top speed -

Rekord A (1963–1965)

March 1964 saw the introduction of the Rekord L-6 with the Opel Kapitän's 2.6-litre inline-six.

Prices in Germany: DM 6.830 to 9.370; front disc brakes: + DM 200, four-speed with floor shift: + DM 180. 885,292 units. In very limited numbers, Karl Deutsch of Cologne sold a convertible version with either 1700 S or 2600 engine at DM 11,765 and 13,060 respectively.

General data:
Wheelbase 
Length 
Width 
Height 
Kerb weight -
Top speed -

Rekord B (1965–1966)

While the Rekord B consisted of only a mild facelift compared to the A, it received Opel's new, more oversquare four-cylinder CIH (cam in head) engines (1500, 1700 S, 1900 S). The CIH engines were used in all subsequent Rekord generations until 1986, when Rekord was replaced by the Opel Omega. The 2,600 cc six-cylinder engine remained unchanged. The line-up was identical to the Rekord A.

Prices in Germany: DM 6,980 to 9,570; power brakes: + DM 95, automatic gearbox: + 950, four-speed gearbox: + 95. 296,771 units.

General data:
Engines: 1,492 cc, or 1,698 cc, or 1,897 cc, or 2,605 cc, 
Wheelbase 
Length 
Width 
Height 
Kerb weight from 
Top speed -

Rekord C (1966–1971)

With 1,276,681 units built, the Rekord C was the most successful Rekord so far. The car proved to be a solid hit with the public: it was reliable, roomy and pleasant to look at with its coke-bottle line.

The range consisted of the two- and four-door saloon, two- and (new) four-door estate, delivery van, and two-door hardtop coupé with 1500, 1700, 1700 S, 1900 S fours or (until 1968) a 2200 six.  Very short-lived (1967 only) was a special taxi version on a longer wheelbase (113 inch) with division, that sold for DM 9,950; with it, Opel tried to get a foothold in the German taxi market, then (as now) dominated by Mercedes-Benz. Again, Karl Deutsch of Cologne offered a convertible version in limited numbers.

There existed several variations of the Rekord C, as well as version made under different names in different countries.

The former Rekord L-6 was replaced by the new Commodore A, a slightly disguised and better-equipped Rekord C available as two- and four-door sedan and hardtop coupé with six-cylinder engines only.

It was during the life of this model (in fact 1967–70) that the Opel Olympia name was revived, but in a separate, smaller car which was based on the period Opel Kadett.

Due to the launch of the smaller Ascona in September 1970, the Rekord was marketed as an executive car rather than a large family car.

Ranger
The Ranger was a Rekord-based range built at the Opel Continental plant in Antwerp, Belgium, for the overall European market. Styling was similar to the Rekord, although the Ranger had a four-headlamp grille setup, similar to the Vauxhall Victor FD range of the time. Initially, there were two models: Ranger 130 and Ranger 153. In 1970 additional models were announced, being the Ranger 1900 and Ranger 2500, and a "SS" variant, based on the Ranger 153.

There was also a South African Ranger, built in General Motors South Africa's plant Port Elizabeth. Known as 'South Africa's Own Car', it featured a springbok logo on its grille, and was also produced as a station wagon.

Other markets
The Rekord C was built as Chevrolet Opala and Comodoro in Brazil from 1968 onward, available in saloon, coupé and estate forms and featuring either Chevrolet's 2.5 L four, 3.8 L inline-six or 4.1 L inline-six. These models received several facelifts and remained in production until about 1992.

A Rekord C coupé was locally built in South Africa as a Ranger SS during the 1970s.

Prices in Germany (1966): DM 7,630 to 9,560; Sprint (1967): DM 9,775.

General data:
Engines: 1492 cc, 58, later 60 PS, 1698 cc, 60, later 66 PS, 1698 cc, 75 PS, 1897 cc, 90 PS, 1897 cc, 106 PS, 2239 cc, 
Wheelbase 
Length 
Width 
Height 
Kerb weight -
Top speed -

Rekord D (1972–1977)

About 1.1 million Rekord Ds were made. Because the name Rekord D was easily mistaken to connote a diesel-powered car, the name Rekord II was often used in sales literature. The first prototype was ready in 1971. The engine types available were 1897 cc or 1698 cc CIH (cam-in-head) four-cylinder gasoline engines. There was also a 2068 cc diesel version which was later accompanied by a smaller 2.0 litre version for certain markets. The diesel engine was higher than gasoline variants, so diesel model hoods have a raised midsection. The six-cylinder variant of this car is called the Commodore B. Transmissions available were standard four-speed manual with either floor or steering-column shifter and TH-180 automatic transmission. The body is of unitary construction. Body types available were two-door sedan, four-door sedan, three-door wagon, five-door wagon, two-door coupé and two-door van. There was also a variant called "Berlina" with more luxurious interior and wheels.

The Rangers were also transferred to this new generation, with the dropping of the 130 and 153 and the adding of a 1.7 L engine. In 1972, the line-up consisted of the base Ranger 1700, the mid-level Ranger 1900, and the top-of-the-line Ranger 2500. In 1974, a 2.8L engine was introduced to the Ranger family. However, by that time the Rangers were unpopular, and were discontinued after the 1976 model year. Most of these were sold exclusively in Continental Europe, especially the Benelux region.

South Africa used this body type for their Chevrolet 2500, 3800 and 4100 series.  They looked visually almost identical but had the Chevrolet 2500 (4-cylinder) or 3800 and 4100 (6-cylinder) engines installed.  They were available as four-door saloon or estate. The six-cylinder versions could be differentiated from the "fours" as they had four round headlights as opposed to the two rectangular units.

These cars were also assembled in Iran (before revolution) from 1974 till 1977 under the local "Chevrolet Royale / or Chevrolet Iran" brand-name by Iran General Motors. The two models were 2500 and 2800 with 2.5L and 2.8L, respectively. The production of these vehicles ended in 1977 when the assembly line started producing the Chevrolet Nova, Buick Skylark, and Cadillac Seville cars until 1987.

Rekord E (1977–1986)

The E model can be subdivided into Rekord E1 (1977–82) and Rekord E2 (1982–86). Over 1.4 million units were made. The Rekord E was available as a two- or four-door sedan, and as a three- or five-door Caravan (station wagon). In some markets where the tax structure was suitable, a three-door van version was also available.

A version of the Rekord E was sold by Vauxhall in the United Kingdom from 1978 as the Carlton, with a droop snoot. Prior to the introduction of the facelift E2 in 1982, the Opel and Vauxhall versions were sold in competition with each other in the UK market.  The Rekord and Carlton's differences in appearance vanished following the 1982 facelift, when most of the Opel range was withdrawn from sale in the UK. The E1 model was also sold in South Africa, initially as the Chevrolet Rekord, before being rebranded as an Opel in 1982, remaining in production until 1984. The E2 model remained in production in South Africa until the early 1990s, and was also available with a V6 engine.

The Opel Rekord finished production in the autumn of 1986 when it was replaced by the Opel Omega, with the Vauxhall equivalent retaining the Carlton nameplate.

The Rekord was also the basis for the first version of the Holden Commodore. The Commodore was produced and sold in Australia from 1978 to 2017.

References

External links

 http://www.opel-p1.nl/ Opel P1 websites
 Opel Rekord.
 Opel Rekord Body History.
  GM Trivia, GMInsideNews Forums.
 Classic Opel Parts database

Rekord
Sedans
Station wagons
Executive cars
Rear-wheel-drive vehicles
Cars introduced in 1953
1960s cars
1970s cars
1980s cars